Lacanian Ink is a cultural journal based in New York City and founded in the Autumn of 1990 by Josefina Ayerza to provide the American intellectual scene with the theoretical perspective of European post-structuralism. It features major analyses of psychoanalytic theory, poetry, philosophy and contemporary art. A distinctive element of its contents is the dissemination of the work of French psychoanalyst Jacques Lacan, whereby the seminars given by Jacques-Alain Miller at Paris VIII on Lacanian theory have become available in English.

Richard Kostelanetz in his book The Decline and Fall of a Soho Art Community notes that Lacanian Ink, together with a number of other journals involved in contemporary culture, have been witnesses to the century's last decade phenomena. "Today, there are but three of these magazines that continue... Bomb Magazine and Lacanian Ink are two of them."

History
From its inception Slovene philosopher Slavoj Žižek joined the editorial board bringing out first drafts of his books in the magazine; since then, he has been published in Lacanian Ink regularly. He aptly expressed the axiom guiding the work of Lacanian Ink: "By rejecting the assertion of identities associated with cultural studies Lacanian Ink outlines a new philosophical universalism." In 2000 French philosopher Alain Badiou joined the editorial board with specialized writing on Lacanian theory and the European Marxist tradition.

In 1997, Lacan dot com became the official site for Lacanian Ink, integrating the texts of its various theorists with an extensive special section on contemporary artists. Notably, the archives of the site include a wide variety of articles and essays by Slavoj Žižek, Jean-Luc Nancy and Alain Badiou, as well as by modern French theorists.

See also
Bomb (magazine)

References

External links 
Lacan dot com
The Symptom

Jacques Lacan
Post-structuralism
Magazines established in 1990
Visual arts magazines published in the United States
Magazines published in New York City